The lamina densa is a component of the basement membrane zone between the epidermis and dermis of the skin, and is an electron-dense zone between the lamina lucida and dermis, synthesized by the basal cells of the epidermis, and composed of (1) type IV collagen, (2) anchoring fibrils made of type VII collagen, and (3) dermal microfibrils.

See also
Basal lamina

References

Skin anatomy